Friedrich Emil Albes (30 October 1861 – 22 March 1923) was a German actor and film director of the silent era.

Selected filmography
 The Traitress (1911)
 Poor Jenny (1912)
 The Dance of Death (1912)
 Veritas Vincit (1919)
 Parisian Women (1921)
 The Woman in the Trunk (1921)
 Bigamy (1922)
 Black Monday (1922)
 Tingeltangel (1922)
 She and the Three (1922)
 The Sun of St. Moritz (1923)
 Dudu, a Human Destiny (1924)

References

Bibliography
 Rolf Giesen. The Nosferatu Story: The Seminal Horror Film, Its Predecessors and Its Enduring Legacy. McFarland, 2019.

External links

1861 births
1923 deaths
German male film actors
German male silent film actors
20th-century German male actors
German male stage actors
Film directors from Lower Saxony
People from Bad Pyrmont